Live Killers is a double live album by the British rock band Queen, released on 22 June 1979. The album was recorded live during the European leg of Queen's Jazz Tour, between 26 January and 1 March 1979.

Recording
The album was self-produced by the band and was their first to be mixed at their own studios, Mountain Studios in Montreux, Switzerland. Guitarist Brian May and drummer Roger Taylor later revealed on the US radio show In the Studio with Redbeard (which spotlighted the making of 1980's The Game) that the band had mixed Live Killers themselves and were unhappy with the final mix.

Release
Live Killers was released as a double vinyl album in the UK by EMI on 22 June 1979, in Europe by Parlophone, and in the US by Elektra and Hollywood Records.

In the territories outside of the United States, Europe and Canada, Elektra Records
re-released a shorter and edited version of the album in 1985 titled Queen Live.

The 1994 issue released as part of the Digital Master Series by EMI Records did not improve upon the quality of the previous release. It was later remastered and restored in better quality by Peter Mew in 2001.

Reception
The album reached number 3 on the UK Albums Chart and number 16 on the Billboard 200 in the United States, and is certified double platinum in the US.

The album received negative reviews from critics on release. In a retrospective appraisal, Greg Prato of AllMusic found the initial reaction inexplicable, calling the album "an excellent document of Queen at the height of their '70s arena rock powers".

Track listing

Omitted tracks
"Somebody to Love"
"Fat Bottomed Girls" (Version from Pavillon de Paris, 27 February 1979, was released on Bohemian Rhapsody: The Original Soundtrack)
"If You Can't Beat Them"
"It's Late"

Singles
"Love of My Life (Live at Festhalle Frankfurt, 2 Feb '79 – edited version)"/"Now I'm Here (Live at Festhalle Frankfurt, 2 Feb '79)"
"We Will Rock You (Fast Version) (Live)"/"Let Me Entertain You (Live)" – Elektra E46532; released August 1979

Charts

Certifications

Personnel
Queen
Freddie Mercury – lead vocals, piano
Brian May – guitars, backing vocals
Roger Taylor – drums, tambourine, timpani, backing vocals, lead vocals on "I'm in Love with My Car"
John Deacon – bass guitar, backing vocals, triangle

Production
Mastered by George Marino at Sterling Sound, NYC

References

External links
 Queen official website: Discography: Live Killers: includes lyrics of "'39".
 Queenlive.ca: "Live Killers" Analysis – an analysis of the edits and overdubs on the album

Queen (band) live albums
1979 live albums
Elektra Records live albums
Hollywood Records live albums
Parlophone live albums